The Sailing Federation of Ukraine is the national governing body for the sport of sailing in Ukraine, recognised by the International Sailing Federation.

Notable sailors
See :Category:Ukrainian sailors

Olympic sailors
See :Category:Olympic sailors of Ukraine

Offshore sailors
See :Category:Ukrainian sailors (sport)

References

External links
 Official website

Ukraine
Sailing